Eugen Josip Galekovic (born 12 June 1981) is an Australian former professional footballer who played as a goalkeeper. He is the current goalkeeper coach for Adelaide United.

Biography

Club career
Galekovic's junior football was mostly played at Chelsea Hajduk in Melbourne's south-eastern suburbs.

Galekovic played school football for St Bede's College.

Galekovic started his career with Morwell based National Soccer League (NSL) side Gippsland Falcons as a 19-year-old in December 2000 before signing with Australian powerhouse South Melbourne the following season.

South Melbourne FC 
Galekovic was second choice keeper in his early seasons at South playing behind Socceroos keeper Dean Anastasiadis. He made his debut in 2002 against rivals Melbourne Knights at Lakeside Stadium. After a string of impressive performances for his age, Galekovic claimed his spot as South's number 1 for the 2002 season ahead of Michael Theo. 

At his time at South, Galekovic made 37 appearances and kept 17 clean sheets in the process. Following his performances for the club, he received a maiden Olyroos selection.

He stayed with South Melbourne until the NSL's closure in 2003–04 where at season's end he secured a place on the list of Beira Mar in Portugal on the back of holding the number one spot for Australia's Olympic football campaign in Athens in 2004.

Galekovic was South's keeper in their last ever national league game in 2004 when South Melbourne Lost 2-1 to Adelaide United in an elimination final by golden goal.

Melbourne Victory

The period at Beira Mar was generally unsuccessful for Galekovic, with him seeing little first team action and thus, he returned to Melbourne to sign for the city's inaugural A-League side Melbourne Victory for season 2005–06, debuting in the opening match against Sydney FC.

Galekovic played 11 matches for the season in an unusual goalkeeper rotation policy employed by Melbourne manager Ernie Merrick in which the other 10 matches saw teammate and former South Melbourne compatriot Michael Theoklitos in goal. Galekovic was second choice keeper for the Victory in the 2006–07 season but an injury to Theoklitos gave Galekovic his first start of the season in the round 13 clash against Queensland Roar at Suncorp Stadium.

Adelaide United

On 30 October, Eugene signed for Melbourne Victory rivals Adelaide United as a replacement for injured keeper Daniel Beltrame and made his debut against the Queensland Roar at Hindmarsh Stadium. On 20 January 2008, Galekovic kept his first clean sheet for Adelaide in a 2–0 win over Brisbane at Hindmarsh Stadium. On 27 December 2008 Galekovic made a string of impressive saves to ensure Adelaide kept its 1–0 advantage over Perth Glory and in the process giving him his fifth clean sheet of the league season.

In February 2010, Galekovic capped off another brilliant year by winning the Adelaide United Player of the Year Award.

In the middle of the 2011–12 A-League Jon McKain resigned his role as captain at Adelaide United. It was then announced that Eugene Galekovic became captain.

On 11 March 2016 Galekovic reached 250 appearances despite a 1–0 defeat to Melbourne City FC.

Melbourne City
On 16 June 2017 Galekovic signed a two-year deal with Melbourne City FC.

Return to Adelaide United
Following the conclusion of his contract with Melbourne City, Galekovic returned to Adelaide United to commence a role as the club's Goalkeeping Coach.

International
Galekovic has been called up for Australia in a preliminary squad with teammates Scott Jamieson and Paul Reid after impressive performances in the A-League and the Asian Champions League. He made his first senior international football debut for Australia on 28 January 2009 in an AFC Asian Cup qualifying match versus Indonesia. He was disappointing in his last outing against Kuwait, by letting in two poor goals after Australia conceded a 2–0 advantage. After Brad Jones left the 2010 World Cup 23-man squad to help his son battle leukaemia, he was called in as a replacement, after missing selection in the 23-man squad first time around. Eugene was selected by Holger Osieck for a 2013 EAFF East Asian Cup qualifying tournament. He started the first match against hosts Hong Kong and came up with audacious stops to save Australia from humiliation as they won 1–0 with a solo effort from Brett Emerton. The other game that Galekovic was a part of a 9–0 thrashing of Guam. After a string good performances for Adelaide United, Holger Osieck selected Eugene Galekovic as part of his 23-man squad for the decisive 2014 FIFA World Cup qualification (AFC) match against Oman.

He was part of the Australia squad for the 2014 World Cup, but did not play.

Career statistics
''CS = Clean sheets

1 – includes A-League final series statistics
2 – includes FIFA Club World Cup statistics; AFC Champions League statistics are included in season commencing after group stages (i.e. 2008 ACL in 2008–09 A-League season etc.)

Honours

Club
Melbourne Victory:
 A-League Championship: 2006–07
 A-League Premiership: 2006–07

Adelaide United:
 FFA Cup: 2014
 A-League Premiership: 2015–16
 A-League Championship: 2015–16

National
Australia
 AFC Asian Cup: 2015

Individual
 A-League Goalkeeper of the Year: 2008–09, 2009–10, 2013–14, 2014–15
 Adelaide United Club Champion: 2008–2009, 2009–10
 Adelaide United Player's Player of the Year: 2008–2009, 2009–10, 2011–12
A-League PFA Team of the Season: 2008–09, 2009–10, 2012–13, 2013–14, 2014–15
 A-League All Stars: 2014
PFA A-League Team of the Decade: 2005–15

Individual Records
 Most Goalkeeper of the Year Awards: 4

References

External links
 Adelaide United profile
 Oz Football profile
 

1981 births
Australian people of Croatian descent
Australia international soccer players
Association football goalkeepers
Olympic soccer players of Australia
Footballers at the 2004 Summer Olympics
A-League Men players
National Soccer League (Australia) players
Adelaide United FC players
Melbourne City FC players
Gippsland Falcons players
Melbourne Knights FC players
Melbourne Victory FC players
S.C. Beira-Mar players
F.C. Marco players
South Melbourne FC players
2010 FIFA World Cup players
2014 FIFA World Cup players
2015 AFC Asian Cup players
Australian expatriate soccer players
Australian expatriate sportspeople in Portugal
Soccer players from Melbourne
Living people
AFC Asian Cup-winning players
Marquee players (A-League Men)
Australian soccer players
Expatriate footballers in Portugal
Association football goalkeeping coaches